Kalyani is a melakarta raga (parent musical scale) in the Carnatic music. It was called Kalyan but is now more popularly called Yaman in Hindustani Music. Its Western equivalent is the Lydian mode.

Kalyani in Carnatic music 
In South Indian weddings it is a very prominently played raga. The word Kalyani means she who causes auspicious things. It is the 65th melakarta raga under the Katapayadi sankhya. It is also called Mechakalyani. The notes for Kalyani are S R2 G3 M2 P D2 N3. Kalyani is the first Prathi Madhyama raga that was ever discovered. It was obtained by the process of Graha Bhedam or modal shift of tonic of the ancient Shadja Grama.

Specifics on this raga 
Kalyani has scope for elaborate alapana. One should not remain too long on panchamam (pa) or alternate between shadjamam and panchamam too frequently. Kalyani is prominently known among the public. It is often performed at the beginning of concerts because it is considered auspicious.

Structure and lakshana 

It is the 5th ragam in the 11th chakra Rudra. The mnemonic name is Rudra-Ma. The mnemonic phrase is sa ri gu mi pa dhi (or 'di') nu. Its  structure is as follows (see swaras in Carnatic music for details on below notation and terms):
 : 
 : 

The notes used in this scale are shadjam, chatushūruti rishabam, antara gandharam, prati madhyamam, chatushruti dhaivatam, kakali nishadam. It is a Sampurna raga in Carnatic music, that is to say, has all the seven notes: Sa, Ri, Ga, Ma, Pa, Dha, Ni. It is the prati madhyamam equivalent of Sankarabharanam, which is the 29th melakarta. This raga is very significant to the chart, because it is sung with all higher notes.

Janya ragams 
Kalyani has many janya ragams (derived scales)associated with it, of which Hamir Kalyani, Mohanakalyani, Amritha Kalyani, Saranga, Nada Kalyani, Sunadavinodini and Yamuna Kalyani are very popular. See List of Janya Ragams for full list of rāgams associated with Kalyani.

Related ragams 
This section covers the theoretical aspects of Kalyani.

Kalyani's notes when shifted using Graha bhedam, yields 5 other major Melakarta ragams, namely, Hanumatodi, Sankarabharanam, Natabhairavi, Kharaharapriya and Harikambhoji. For further details and an illustration of Graha bhedam of this ragam refer Related ragams section in Sankarabharanam page.

Popular compositions 
Nearly every significant Carnatic composer (including the Trinity of Carnatic music) has composed several pieces in the Kalyani ragam. Kalyani is considered one of the "major" ragams of Carnatic music along with Sankarabharanam, Todi and Kharaharapriya (the set of "major" rāgams is an informal grouping of the most popular Melakarta ragams used for elaboration and exploration, and which often form the centerpiece of a Carnatic music concert in the form of a Ragam Tanam Pallavi (RTP) or a kriti). See Related ragams section for further information on relationships between these ragams. The state anthem of Mysore, Kayou Shri Gowri is also set in this raga.
Here is a short list of compositions in Kalyani.

 Nidhi chāla sukhamā, Etavunnārā, Sundari nī Divya, Ammā Rāvammā, Sandehamu Elara, Bhajana Seyave, Nammi Vacchina and Vāsudēvanyani by Tyagaraja 
 Kamalāmbāṃ bhajarē ,Bhajarē Re Chittha, Shiva Kameshwarim Chintayeham by Muthuswami Dikshitar 
 Kantimati Karunamrta by Subbarama Dikshitar
 Himādri sutē pāhimaṃ, Birāna varālichi, and Talli Ninnu Nēranammi by Syama Sastri in Telugu
 Adrisutavara, Pankaja lōcana, Pahimaṃ Śri Vāgīśvari(Navarathri second day krithi), Paripahimamayi, Sarasa Suvadana, Sevesyanandureswara by Swathi Thirunal
 Nannu brovamani cheppave, Bhajare sriramam by Bhadrachala Ramadasu
 kallu sakkare koLLiro (3rd Navaratna Malike), Kelano Hari Talano, Nambi Kettavarillavo Rangayya, Anjikinyatakayya, Dayamado Ranga by Purandara Dasa
 Tiliyado Ninnata By Kalluru Subbannacharya(Vyasa Vitthala Dasa)
 Unnai allal by Papanasam Sivan
 Sadanandame by Koteeswara Iyer
 Mahatripurasundari by Jayachamarajendra Wodeyar
 Tanom nom tara tillana by M Balamurali Krishna

Film songs 
The most popular film composition set in Kalyani is "Mannavan Vandhanadi Thozhi" by K. V. Mahadevan rendered by P. Susheela," and Sindhanai Sei Maname by G. Ramanadhan. M. S. Viswanathan has composed numerous songs in Kalyani such as "Isai Ketal Puvi" from the movie Thavapudhalavan, "Indha Mandrathil" from Policekaran Magal, "Maalai Sudum mananaal" from Nichaya Thamboolam, "Kannan Vandhan" from Ramu, "Azhagennum Oviyam Inge", "Paar Magale Paar", "Varuvan Vadivelan", "Maduraiyil Parandha Meenkodi", "Mugathil Mugam paarkalam". "Amma Endrazhaikkaatha Uyirillaye" by Ilayaraja, "Manmadha Pournami" (P. Susheela) in Panchavankadu by G. Devarajan. The track Kalaivaniye in Sindhu Bhairavi is set in the Kalyani rāgam and sung without an avarohaṇam. The Bharathiar composition Veenai Adi Nee Enakku from the movie Ezhavathu Manithan is set in the Kalyani ragam. The Telugu movie Sankarabharanam has a Shloka "Māṇikya Upalālayanti" set in this ragam. "Aa Nimishathinte" from the Malayalam movie Chandrakantham and "Swarganandini" from Lankadahanam composed by M. S. Viswanathan is set in Kalyani.

Tamil

Malayalam

Historical information 
Yaman/Aiman is not an ancient raga. It is first mentioned in the literature in the late 16th century, by which time it was very popular: The Sahasras contains 45 dhrupad song-texts for Kalyan and five for Iman-Kalyan. According to Venkatamakhin (1620), Kalyan was a favourite melody to the Arabs, and Pundarika included Yaman among his 'Persian' Ragas.

Notes

References

Literature 

.
.
.
.
.
.
.
.
.

External links 
 

Melakarta ragas